Óscar Gil may refer to:

Óscar Gil (footballer, born 1995), Spanish football centre-back for Racing Santander
Óscar Gil (footballer, born 1998), Spanish football right-back for Espanyol